The 2013 Stanley Cup playoffs of the National Hockey League (NHL) began on April 30, 2013, following the conclusion of the 2012–13 NHL regular season. The regular season was shortened to 48 games, and the playoffs pushed to a later date, due to a lockout. The playoffs ended on June 24, 2013, with the Chicago Blackhawks defeating the Boston Bruins in six games to win the Stanley Cup. Patrick Kane won the Conn Smythe trophy as the playoffs MVP, with 19 points (9 goals and 10 assists).

The Blackhawks made the playoffs as the Presidents' Trophy winners with the most points (i.e. best record) during the regular season. The Detroit Red Wings increased their postseason appearance streak to twenty-two seasons, the longest active streak at the time. The Toronto Maple Leafs made the playoffs for the first time since 2004, breaking the longest active drought at the time. The 2013 Stanley Cup playoffs marked the first time since 1996 that every Original Six team advanced to the playoffs in the same year. Additionally, four Canadian teams qualified for the playoffs (Montreal, Ottawa, Toronto, and Vancouver), the most since 2006. The first round series between Montreal and Ottawa was the first playoff series between two Canadian teams since 2004. For the second time in three years, all three teams from California made the playoffs. For the first time since 2007, and for only the third time in history, all four former WHA teams; Carolina (formerly the Hartford Whalers), Colorado (formerly the Quebec Nordiques), Edmonton, and Phoenix (formerly the Winnipeg Jets) missed the playoffs in the same year. The New Jersey Devils and Philadelphia Flyers missed the playoffs this year, marking the first time this happened since the Devils' move to the East Coast in 1982.

For the first time since 1945, the four semifinalists were the previous four Stanley Cup champions: Pittsburgh (2009), Chicago (2010), Boston (2011), and Los Angeles (2012). In fact, Detroit, the 2008 Stanley Cup champions, were the last team to be eliminated in the conference semifinals, so the last five teams remaining were the previous five champions. The 2013 Stanley Cup Finals were contested between Chicago Blackhawks and Boston Bruins, the first meeting in the Final between the two teams, and the first time that two Original Six teams competed in the Final since Montreal defeated the New York Rangers in the 1979 Stanley Cup Finals. It is also the most recent Cup Final to feature two Original Six teams.

The Blackhawks also became the first Presidents' Trophy winners to win the Stanley Cup since the Red Wings in 2008. They are the most recent NHL team to accomplish this feat.

These playoffs featured 27 overtime games, the most since 1993 and the second-most in NHL history.

Playoff seeds
The top eight teams in each conference qualified for the playoffs. The top three seeds in each conference were awarded to the division winners; while the five remaining spots were awarded to the highest finishers in their respective conferences.

Eastern Conference
Pittsburgh Penguins, Atlantic Division champions, Eastern Conference regular season champions – 72 points
Montreal Canadiens, Northeast Division champions – 63 points
Washington Capitals, Southeast Division champions – 57 points
Boston Bruins – 62 points
Toronto Maple Leafs – 57 points
New York Rangers – 56 points (22 )
Ottawa Senators – 56 points (21 )
New York Islanders – 55 points

Western Conference
Chicago Blackhawks, Central Division champions, Western Conference regular season champions, Presidents' Trophy winners – 77 points
Anaheim Ducks, Pacific Division champions – 66 points
Vancouver Canucks, Northwest Division champions – 59 points
St. Louis Blues – 60 points
Los Angeles Kings – 59 points
San Jose Sharks – 57 points
Detroit Red Wings – 56 points
Minnesota Wild – 55 points

Playoff bracket
In each round, the highest remaining seed in each conference was matched against the lowest remaining seed. The higher-seeded team was awarded home ice advantage. In the Stanley Cup Finals, home ice was awarded to the team with the better regular season record. Each best-of-seven series followed a 2–2–1–1–1 format: the higher-seeded team played at home for games one and two (and games five and seven, if necessary), and the lower-seeded team was at home for games three and four (and game six, if necessary).

Conference Quarterfinals

Eastern Conference Quarterfinals

(1) Pittsburgh Penguins vs. (8) New York Islanders
The Pittsburgh Penguins entered the playoffs as the Eastern Conference regular season champions, earning 72 points. The New York Islanders earned 55 points during the regular season to finish eighth overall in the Eastern Conference. This was the fourth playoff meeting for these two teams, with the Islanders having won all three of the previous playoff series. Their most recent meeting was in the 1993 Patrick Division Finals, where New York upset first place Pittsburgh in seven games. The Penguins won four of the five games in the regular season series.

The Penguins defeated the Islanders in six games. Pittsburgh goalie Marc-Andre Fleury stopped all 26 New York shots in a 5–0 shutout in game one. The Islanders then took game two, 4–3, as New York's Colin McDonald, Matt Martin, and Kyle Okposo scored three unanswered goals in the second and third periods. In game three, Chris Kunitz scored the winning goal on a power play at 08:44 of overtime to give Pittsburgh a 5–4 victory. New York evened the series with a 6–4 win in game four, with Mark Streit, John Tavares, and Casey Cizikas scoring three unanswered goals in the third period. Penguins head coach Dan Bylsma then replaced Fleury with Tomas Vokoun as starting goalie for game five, who stopped all 31 shots to lead Pittsburgh to a 4–0 win. In the sixth game, the Islanders put up three leads only to have the Penguins tie it up three consecutive times. Brooks Orpik scored at 07:49 of overtime to give Pittsburgh a 4–3 victory and their fourth and final win of the series.

(2) Montreal Canadiens vs. (7) Ottawa Senators
The Montreal Canadiens entered the playoffs as the second seed in the Eastern Conference by winning the Northeast Division with 63 points. The Ottawa Senators earned 56 points during the regular season to finish seventh overall in the Eastern Conference. This was the first playoff series between these two teams, and the first playoff series between teams from Montreal and Ottawa since 1928, when the Montreal Maroons defeated the original Ottawa Senators in the Canadian Division Quarterfinals. The two teams split their four-game regular season series.

The Senators defeated the Canadiens in five games. Midway through the second period of game one, Senators defenceman Eric Gryba was given a five-minute major penalty, a game misconduct, and later a two-game suspension after delivering a hit on Montreal's Lars Eller that sent the Canadiens' centre to the hospital. Despite Gryba's ejection, the Senators won the game, 4–2, with goalie Craig Anderson stopping 48 out of 50 Montreal shots on goal. The Canadiens took game two, 3–1, led by goalie Carey Price's 29 saves. Emotions between the two division rivals boiled over in game three as the teams combined for 236 penalty minutes, but Ottawa centre Jean-Gabriel Pageau scored a hat trick, leading the Senators to a 6–1 victory. The Canadiens then jumped to a 2–0 lead in the second period of game four, but Ottawa scored twice in the final ten minutes of the game. Mika Zibanejad scored a goal off his skate at 11:55 of the third period, cutting the lead to 2–1, with the goal allowed to stand after a video review determined that he did not kick the puck into the net. Cory Conacher got the tying goal with 22.6 seconds left in regulation, and at intermission Montreal replaced an injured Price with Peter Budaj in goal. Kyle Turris scored the winner at 02:32 of overtime to give Ottawa the 3–2 win. The Senators then eliminated the Canadiens with a 6–1 victory in game five; Montreal was without several players due to injury including Price and captain Brian Gionta.

One of the quirkier story lines of the series was the large number of teeth lost by players, highlighted by Anderson losing one in game one, Price losing one in game two, and Pageau after taking a stick to the mouth from Montreal defenceman P. K. Subban while scoring his first ever NHL playoff goal, and first of three in game three.

(3) Washington Capitals vs. (6) New York Rangers
The Washington Capitals entered the playoffs as the third seed in the Eastern Conference by winning the Southeast Division with 57 points. The New York Rangers earned 56 points during the regular season to finish sixth overall in the Eastern Conference. This was the eighth playoff meeting for these two teams, and the fourth in the last five years, with the Capitals having won four of the seven previous series. This was a rematch of the previous year's Eastern Conference Semifinals, which the Rangers won in seven games. New York won two of the three games in the regular season series.

The Rangers advanced to the second round after soundly defeating the Capitals in game seven, 5–0. Game seven was the only one in the series in which the visiting team was the winner, and it was the first road win in a seventh game in franchise history for the Rangers. Washington scored three unanswered goals in the second period of game one to win, 3–1. In game two, Capitals defenceman Mike Green scored the only goal in the game at 08:00 of overtime. The Rangers then evened the series after recording back-to-back 4–3 victories in games three and four, aided by Derick Brassard's one goal and two assists in the former, and Carl Hagelin's one goal and two assists in the latter. Washington won game five, 2–1 on Mike Ribeiro's goal at 09:24 of overtime, while Brassard's second period goal proved to be the difference in New York's 1–0 win in game six. The Rangers then controlled game seven, winning 5–0, with five different players scoring for New York, and goalie Henrik Lundqvist stopping all 35 Washington shots in his second consecutive shutout.

(4) Boston Bruins vs. (5) Toronto Maple Leafs
The Boston Bruins entered the playoffs as the fourth seed in the Eastern Conference with 62 points. The Toronto Maple Leafs earned 57 points during the regular season to finish fifth overall in the Eastern Conference. This was the fourteenth playoff series between these two teams, with the Maple Leafs having won eight of the previous thirteen series. Their most recent meeting was the 1974 Stanley Cup Quarterfinals, where the Bruins defeated the Maple Leafs in four games. Boston won three of the four games in the regular season series.

The Bruins rallied from a 4–1 third period deficit in game seven to defeat the Maple Leafs in overtime, 5–4, and advance to the second round. Boston jumped to a 3–1 lead in the series before Toronto won two straight games to force game seven. David Krejci led Boston to a 4–1 victory in game one with a goal and two assists. Joffrey Lupul then scored two goals to lead the Maple Leafs to a 4–2 victory in game two. The Bruins then took game three, 5–2, aided by goalie Tuukka Rask's 45 saves out of 47 shots. Krejci's goal at 13:06 of overtime then gave Boston the win in game four, 4–3. But the Leafs bounced back in game five with a 2–1 victory, behind James Reimer's 43 saves. Reimer then stopped 29 of 30 shots in Toronto's 2–1 win in game six. In game seven, the Maple Leafs jumped to a 4–1 lead in the third period, aided by two goals by Cody Franson. But the Bruins began their comeback with Nathan Horton's goal at 09:18. Then, after pulling goalie Rask to add an extra attacker, Boston scored twice within the last two minutes of regulation to tie the game, first with Milan Lucic's score at 18:38, and then Patrice Bergeron's goal at 19:09. Bergeron then scored at 06:05 in overtime to give the Bruins the 5–4 win and the series. It was the first game seven in NHL playoff history in which a team trailing by three goals in the third period went on to win the game and, therefore, the series. These circumstances were matched during the first round of the 2019 Stanley Cup playoffs, when the San Jose Sharks overcame a three-goal deficit in the third period of game seven over the Vegas Golden Knights to win the series.

Western Conference Quarterfinals

(1) Chicago Blackhawks vs. (8) Minnesota Wild
The Chicago Blackhawks entered the playoffs as the Western Conference regular season champions and Presidents' Trophy winners, earning 77 points. The Minnesota Wild earned 55 points during the regular season to finish eighth overall in the Western Conference. This was the first playoff meeting for these two teams. Chicago won two of the three games in the regular season series.

The Blackhawks defeated the Wild in five games. Bryan Bickell's goal at 16:35 of overtime gave Chicago a 2–1 victory in game one. Then, Michael Frolik and Patrick Sharp each scored two goals in the Blackhawks' 5–2 win in game two. Jason Zucker scored at 02:15 of overtime to give the Wild a 3–2 victory in game three. But the Blackhawks controlled games four and five, with Chicago goalie Corey Crawford making 25 saves in a 3–0 shutout in the former, and winger Marian Hossa leading the Blackhawks with two goals and one assist in a 5–1 win in the latter.

(2) Anaheim Ducks vs. (7) Detroit Red Wings
The Anaheim Ducks entered the playoffs as the second seed in the Western Conference by winning the Pacific Division with 66 points. The Detroit Red Wings earned 56 points during the regular season to finish seventh overall in the Western Conference, extending their streak of consecutive playoff appearances to 22. This was the sixth playoff meeting for these two teams, with the Red Wings having won three of the five previous series. The most recent meeting of these teams was in the 2009 Western Conference Semifinals, which Detroit won in seven games. Detroit won two of the three games in the regular season series.

The Red Wings defeated the Ducks in game seven of the series, 3–2, to advance to the next round. Four games in the series were decided in overtime. In game one, Teemu Selanne scored a power play goal in the third period, and Francois Beauchemin added an empty netter in the final minute, to give Anaheim a 3–1 win. In game two, the Ducks scored three unanswered goals in the third period to tie the game, 4–4, but Red Wings winger Gustav Nyquist scored at 01:21 of overtime to give Detroit the victory. game three was scoreless in the second period until Detroit forward Justin Abdelkader was given a five-minute major penalty, a game misconduct, and later a two-game suspension after illegally charging Anaheim defenceman Toni Lydman. Although they scored only once in the ensuing five-minute power play, goalie Jonas Hiller stopped all 23 Detroit shots to lead the Ducks to a 4–0 win. The next three games went into overtime, as Damien Brunner scored at 15:10 of the extra session to give the Red Wings a 3–2 victory in game four, Nick Bonino at 01:54 to give the Ducks a 3–2 victory in game five, and Henrik Zetterberg at 01:04 in Detroit's 4–3 win in game six. Zetterberg then led the Red Wings with a goal and an assist, and goalie Jimmy Howard made 31 saves in their 3–2 victory in game seven.

(3) Vancouver Canucks vs. (6) San Jose Sharks
The Vancouver Canucks entered the playoffs as the third seed in the Western Conference by winning the Northwest Division with 59 points. The San Jose Sharks earned 57 points during the regular season to finish sixth overall in the Western Conference and third in the Pacific Division. This was the second playoff series between these two teams, with the only previous meeting being the 2011 Western Conference Final, where Vancouver defeated San Jose in five games. San Jose won all three games in the regular season series.

The Sharks recorded their first playoff sweep in team history. Led by Logan Couture's second period goal and a third period assist, San Jose scored three unanswered goals in game one to win, 3–1. The Canucks held a 2–1 lead late in the third period of game two off of Ryan Kesler's two goals, but then Patrick Marleau tied the game with 55 seconds left in regulation and Raffi Torres scored at 05:31 into overtime to give the Sharks a 3–2 victory. In game three of the series leading 2–1 to start the third period San Jose's Logan Couture and Patrick Marleau then each scored in a span of nine seconds giving the Sharks a 4–1 lead. The Sharks would earn a 5–2 victory. In game four of the series Brent Burns scored to give the Sharks the lead, later Mason Raymond would score on the power play. San Jose would take the lead again in the dying minutes of the first with a power play tally from Joe Pavelski to make it 2–1. In the third period the Vancouver Canucks rallied back to tie the game and gain the lead from the strengths of Alex Burrows and Alexander Edler goals to make it 3–2. In the last minutes of the third Joe Pavelski tallied the game tying goal as regulation ended 3–3. Patrick Marleau then scored the series winning goal at 13:18 of overtime in San Jose's 4–3 victory in game four.

(4) St. Louis Blues vs. (5) Los Angeles Kings
The St. Louis Blues entered the playoffs as the fourth seed in the Western Conference with 60 points. The Los Angeles Kings, entering as the defending Stanley Cup champions, earned 59 points during the regular season to finish fifth overall in the Western Conference. This was the fourth playoff series between these two teams, with St. Louis having won two of the three previous series. The most recent meeting was the previous year's Western Conference Semifinals, in which the Kings swept the Blues out of the playoffs. Los Angeles won all three games in the regular season series.

The Kings overcame a 2–0 deficit to defeat the Blues in six games. All six games in the series were decided by only one goal. In game one, St. Louis had a 1–0 lead late in the third period before Los Angeles winger Justin Williams tied the game with 31.6 seconds left in regulation. In overtime, Blues defenceman Kevin Shattenkirk was given a four-minute penalty for high-sticking, but on the ensuing power play Kings goalie Jonathan Quick misplayed the puck behind his own net and St. Louis winger Alexander Steen wrapped it into the net for the game-winning shorthanded goal. The Blues also won game two by the same score of 2–1, as defenceman Barret Jackman scored the winning goal with 50.4 seconds remaining in the third period. The Kings then began their four-game winning streak in the series, first with a 1–0 victory in game three, as Quick stopped all 30 Blues shots on goal, and Slava Voynov providing Los Angeles' lone score. Williams and Anze Kopitar then scored 76 seconds apart in the third period of game four to help give Los Angeles a 4–3 victory. In game five, Blues defenceman Alex Pietrangelo tied the game with 44.1 seconds remaining in regulation, but Voynov scored at 08:00 of overtime and the Kings won, 3–2. Los Angeles then closed out the series with a 2–1 victory in game six, as forward Dustin Penner scored the winning goal with 0.2 seconds left in the second period.

Conference Semifinals

Eastern Conference Semifinals

(1) Pittsburgh Penguins vs. (7) Ottawa Senators
This was the fourth playoff meeting for these two teams, all occurring over the last seven seasons, with Pittsburgh winning the previous two. Their most recent meeting was in the 2010 Eastern Conference Quarterfinals, which Pittsburgh won in six games. The Penguins won all three games in the regular season series.

The Penguins eliminated the Senators in five games. Evgeni Malkin recorded a goal and an assist in Pittsburgh's 4–1 victory in game one. In game two, Sidney Crosby recorded his second career playoff hat trick as the Penguins went on to win, 4–3. The Senators then took game three, 2–1, after Daniel Alfredsson tied the game with a short handed goal with only 22.6 seconds left in regulation, and Colin Greening scored the game winner at 07:39 of the second overtime period. But, Pittsburgh came back with a 7–3 victory in game four, with Kris Letang recording four assists. James Neal recorded his first career playoff hat trick in Pittsburgh's 6–2 win in game five to close out the series and help the Penguins advance to the Conference Finals.

(4) Boston Bruins vs. (6) New York Rangers

This was the tenth playoff series between the teams, with Boston having won six of the nine previous series. They last met in the 1973 Stanley Cup Quarterfinals, which the Rangers won in five games. The Rangers won two of the three games in the regular season series.

The Bruins eliminated the Rangers in five games. Brad Marchand's goal at 15:40 of overtime gave Boston a 3–2 victory in game one. In game two, five different Boston players scored goals, giving them a 5–2 win. The Bruins then won game three, 2–1, as Daniel Paille scored the game winner with 03:31 left in regulation after the puck deflected off of Henrik Lundqvist's head, popped into the air and then bounced in an area around the goal crease where the Rangers goalie lost sight of it. The Rangers avoided elimination in game four, as Chris Kreider scored at 07:03 of overtime, redirecting Rick Nash's shot into the Bruins net, giving New York a 4–3 victory. But Boston was victorious in game five, 3–1, scoring three unanswered goals, including two from Gregory Campbell.

Western Conference Semifinals

(1) Chicago Blackhawks vs. (7) Detroit Red Wings
This was the sixteenth playoff meeting for these two teams, with Chicago having won eight of the previous fifteen series. Their most recent meeting was in the 2009 Western Conference Final, which Detroit won in five games. The Blackhawks won all four games in the regular season series.

The Blackhawks came back from a 3–1 series deficit to defeat the Red Wings in seven games. In game one, Johnny Oduya and Marcus Kruger scored in about three minutes apart in the third period, as Chicago broke a 1–1 tie to win, 4–1. Henrik Zetterberg then recorded two assists, leading the Red Wings to a 4–1 victory in game two. Detroit also won game three, 3–1, as goalie Jimmy Howard made 39 saves out of 40 shots, and Gustav Nyquist and Drew Miller scored in 31 seconds apart in the second period. The Red Wings then gave the Blackhawks their first three-game losing streak all season, as Howard made 28 saves in Detroit's 2–0 victory in game four. But Chicago began their comeback in the series in game five as Andrew Shaw scored two goals in a 4–1 win. In the third period of game six, the Blackhawks scored three straight goals from three different players, including one on a penalty shot by Michael Frolik, to overcome a one-goal deficit and eventually win 4–3. Brent Seabrook scored at 03:35 of overtime to give Chicago a 2–1 victory in game seven to advance to the Conference Finals.  This was the Red Wings’ last game ever as a Western Conference team, effectively ending their rivalry with the Blackhawks.  They moved to the Eastern Conference the following season.

(5) Los Angeles Kings vs. (6) San Jose Sharks
This was the second playoff series meeting for these two teams. Their first meeting was in the 2011 Western Conference Quarterfinals, which San Jose won in six games. The two teams split their four-game regular season series.

In a series where the home team won all games, the Kings outlasted the Sharks in game seven at the Staples Center to advance to the Conference Finals. Los Angeles goalie Jonathan Quick stopped all 35 San Jose shots in a 2–0 home victory in game one. In game two, the Kings' Dustin Brown and Trevor Lewis scored power play goals in 22 seconds apart with less than 2 minutes left in regulation, overcoming a one-goal deficit to win, 4–3. With the series moving to HP Pavilion, Logan Couture's goal at 01:29 of overtime gave the Sharks a 2–1 victory in game three. San Jose then evened the series in game four with another 2–1 victory after building a 2–0 second period lead. In game five back at the Staples Center, the Kings limited the Sharks to 24 shots on goal and Quick recorded his second shutout in the series in a 3–0 win for Los Angeles. The series then ended with two consecutive 2–1 games: Joe Thornton and T.J. Galiardi scored for San Jose in game six at HP Pavilion, and Justin Williams scored both Los Angeles goals in game seven at the Staples Center.

Conference Finals

Eastern Conference Final

(1) Pittsburgh Penguins vs. (4) Boston Bruins
This was the fifth playoff series for these two teams, with each team having won two of the four previous meetings. This was also the third time that they met in a Wales/Eastern Conference Final, having met at this stage in their two previous playoff meetings; in 1991 the Penguins lost the first two games to the Bruins but went on to win the next four, and the next year (1992) they swept the Bruins out of the playoffs; the Penguins went on to win the Stanley Cup in both years. The Pittsburgh Penguins made it to their third Conference Finals since 2008, while the Boston Bruins were making their second appearance in three years. The Penguins won all three games in the regular season series, all three games by one goal.

The Bruins swept the top seeded Penguins, as Boston goalie Tuukka Rask recorded his first two career playoff shutouts, and only allowed two Pittsburgh goals throughout the sweep. Penguins forwards Evgeni Malkin, Sidney Crosby, Jarome Iginla, Pascal Dupuis and James Neal had scored between them 28 goals and 64 points during the first two rounds, but against the Bruins they were outscored 12–2 with Dupuis recording a single assist. The Penguins had scored 13 power-play goals in the first 11 games, but went 0-for 15 on the powerplay in the Conference Final. David Krejci had two goals in the Bruins' 3–0 game one victory. In game two, the Bruins recorded six goals and Rask limited the Penguins to only one goal. Patrice Bergeron then scored at 15:19 of the second overtime period of game three to give Boston a 2–1 win. Finally in game four, Adam McQuaid scored at 05:01 of the third period, the only goal in the game, to give the Bruins a 1–0 win and a trip to the Cup Finals. This marked the first time since 1979 that the Penguins were swept in a playoff series; the Bruins also swept the Penguins out of that year's playoffs. During the 2012–13 season trade deadline, the Bruins were close to acquiring Iginla from the Calgary Flames, but he chose the Penguins instead; Milan Lucic said after the series that Iginla's spurning of Boston ignited the sweep of Pittsburgh, suggesting "When a guy chooses another team over your team, it does light a little bit of a fire underneath you."

Western Conference Final

(1) Chicago Blackhawks vs. (5) Los Angeles Kings
This was the second playoff series for these two teams. Their only previous meeting was in the 1974 Stanley Cup Quarterfinals, which Chicago won in five games. The Blackhawks won two of the three games in the regular season series. The Chicago Blackhawks made it to their third Conference Finals since 2009, while the Los Angeles Kings were making their second straight appearance.

The Blackhawks defeated the Kings in five games by extending Los Angeles' road playoff losing streak to six, and they gave the Kings their first home playoff loss in game four. Patrick Sharp and Marian Hossa scored back-to-back goals in their 2–1 victory in game one, Four different Chicago players scored unanswered goals in their 4–2 win in game two, forcing Los Angeles goalie Jonathan Quick to be replaced by backup Jonathan Bernier midway through the second period. Quick then made 19 out of 20 saves, and Justin Williams and Slava Voynov scored Los Angeles' two unanswered goals, in the Kings' 3–1 win in game three. But in game four, Chicago's Marian Hossa scored the game-winning goal 70 seconds into the third period to give the Blackhawks a 3–2 win. Patrick Kane then recorded a hat trick, including the game-winning goal at 11:40 of double overtime, to give Chicago a 4–3 victory in game five and advance to the Stanley Cup Finals.

Stanley Cup Finals 

This was the seventh playoff meeting between these two teams, with Boston winning five of the six previous series. They last met in the 1978 Stanley Cup Quarterfinals, where Boston won in a four-game sweep. The teams did not meet in the regular season because of the intra-conference restriction for the season because of the lockout. This was Boston's nineteenth Finals appearance. They last advanced to the Finals in  where they defeated the Vancouver Canucks in seven games. This was Chicago's twelfth Finals appearance. This was the first Stanley Cup Finals to feature two Original Six teams since .

Player statistics

Skaters

These are the top ten skaters based on points. If the list were to exceed ten skaters because of a tie in points, then goals will take precedence.

Goaltending
This is a combined table of the top five goaltenders based on goals against average and the top five goaltenders based on save percentage, with at least 420 minutes played. The table is sorted by GAA, and the criteria for inclusion are bolded.

Television
The 2013 playoffs marked the second year of a contract between the NHL and Comcast's NBCUniversal to air the Stanley Cup playoffs in the United States. As part of the deal, local coverage from regional sports networks could co-exist with national broadcasts by NBC and associated channels NBC Sports Network, CNBC and NHL Network during the first round. The NBC Sports Group's family of channels would then gain exclusive rights to the conference semifinals and beyond.

National Canadian English-language coverage is split between CBC and the TSN family of networks, including TSN2. French-language telecasts are broadcast on RDS and RDS2.

For the first time since they started broadcasting Stanley Cup playoff games in 2006, NBC televised Saturday primetime contests in the second and third rounds instead of in the afternoon. The delayed start of the playoffs caused afternoon conflicts with NBC's coverage of the French Open, among other events in late May.

References

Playoffs, 2013
Stanley Cup playoffs